Castano may refer to:

 Castano Primo, a city and comune in Province of Milan, in the Italian region Lombardy
 Daniel Castano, an American professional baseball pitcher
 Ernesto Castano, an Italian former professional footballer

See also 

 Castana (disambiguation)
 Castaño (disambiguation)
 Castagno (disambiguation)